The University of Montenegro Faculty of Philosophy (Montenegrin: Filozofski fakultet Univerziteta Crne Gore Филозофски факултет Универзитета Црне Горе) is one of the educational institutions of the University of Montenegro. The building is located in Nikšić, close to the city center.

History 

The Faculty's history can be traced back to 1947, when the Pedagogical College (Montenegrin: Viša pedagoška škola Виша педагошка школа) was founded in Cetinje. The College was moved to Nikšić in 1963, and renamed the Pedagogical Academy (Pedagoška akademija Педагошка академија). Between 1977 and 1988, the school was called the Teaching Faculty (Nastavnički fakultet Наставнички факултет).

Since 1988, the Faculty is known by its current name. It officially became part of the University of Montenegro on April 29, 1974, when the Agreement on Association into the University of Titograd (today's University of Montenegro) was signed with the representatives of the Faculty of Law, the Faculty of Engineering, the Faculty of Economics, the Maritime Studies College from Kotor and three independent scientific institutes from Titograd.

Organization 

The Faculty of Philosophy is a complex educational and scientific institution which organizes undergraduate, specialist and postgraduate studies as well as doctoral studies within its main activities.

Undergraduate studies 

Undergraduate studies are organized on the following 15 departments of the Faculty of Philosophy:
 Sociology
 Philosophy
 History
 Geography
 Montenegrin language and South Slavic literature
 Serbian language and South Slavic literature
 English language and literature
 German language and literature
 Italian language and literature
 Russian language and literature
 French language and literature
 Pedagogy
 Teacher education
 Preschool education
 Psychology

Specialist studies 

Postgraduate specialist studies are organized on the following departments:
 Sociology
 History
 Geography
 Montenegrin language and South Slavic literature
 Serbian language and South Slavic literature
 English language and literature
 German language and literature
 Italian language and literature
 Russian language and literature
 French language and literature
 Pedagogy
 Preschool education
 Psychology

Master studies 

Master studies are organized at the following courses of studies:
 Sociology
 Philosophy
 History
 Geography
 Montenegrin language and South Slavic literature
 Serbian language and South Slavic literature
 English language and literature
 German language and literature
 Italian language and literature
 Russian language and literature
 French language and literature
 Pedagogy
 Teacher education
 Psychology

Doctoral studies 

Doctoral studies are organized on departments of the Faculty:
 Sociology
 Philosophy
 History
 Geography
 Montenegrin language and South Slavic literature
 Serbian language and South Slavic literature
 English language and literature
 German language and literature
 Italian language and literature
 Russian language and literature
 French language and literature

References 

Philosophy
Montenegro
Faculty of Philosophy
Montenegro
1963 establishments in Yugoslavia